It is Fine! Everything Is Fine. is a 2007 American independent drama film directed by David Brothers and Crispin Glover. It was written by and stars Steven C. Stewart. It also stars Margit Carstensen.

It Is Fine is the second in a planned trilogy of films directed by Glover (all of them under the amplificated title "A Crispin Hellion Glover Film"), with the other two entries being What Is It? (2005) and It Is Mine (TBA).

Synopsis  
A psycho-sexual, fantastical retelling of the life of a man with cerebral palsy and a fetish for girls with long hair.

Production 
The film was completely funded by Crispin Glover, through his production company Volcanic Eruptions. It was written by and stars Utah writer-actor Steven C. Stewart, who also appears in What Is It? (2005). Glover and co-director and production designer David Brothers were working on an eventually unfinished project together in the late 1980's when Brothers passed Stewart's screenplay on to Glover, which the two committed to directing together with Stewart in the lead role. Stewart died of complications from cerebral palsy in 2001, only one month after principal filming wrapped.

Glover has said that the script was in the style of a 1970s made-for-TV movie, and has said that "It's an autobiographical, psychosexual, fantastical retelling of [Stewart's] point-of-view of life." Apart from the opening and closing scenes that were filmed in a nursing home, It is Fine. Everything is Fine! was shot entirely at David Brothers's sound stage in Salt Lake City, Utah. Glover has stated that it is "probably the best film [he'll] ever work on in [his] entire career."

Release 
This film premiered at the Egyptian Theater in Park City, Utah on January 23, 2007 for the Midnight screening as an official selection of the 2007 Sundance Film Festival. Glover screens the film alongside What Is It? at independent theatres, typically accompanied by a question-and-answer session, a one-hour dramatic narration of eight different profusely illustrated books as a slideshow, and a meet-and-greet/book signing with Glover.

Reception  
The film had received an 80% approval rating on Rotten Tomatoes based on 10 reviews.

References

External links 
 Official Site
 
 Crispin Glover discusses It Is Fine
 Article & video about Steven C. Stewart and the movie

2007 films
2007 drama films
American drama films
Films about people with cerebral palsy
Films directed by Crispin Glover
American independent films
Films shot in Utah
American avant-garde and experimental films
2000s avant-garde and experimental films
2007 independent films
2000s English-language films
2000s American films